Kyŏngwŏn County is a kun, or county, in North Hamgyong province, North Korea, located at , formerly known as Saebyŏl.  It is bordered by the People's Republic of China to the north and east, Kyonghung to the southeast, Hoeryong to the southwest, and Onsong to the west.

The western region of Kyongwon is mountainous, while the east is relatively flat. The highest point is Chungsan.  The largest river is the Tumen, which flows along the eastern border. Numerous tributaries of the Tumen also flow through the county. Approximately 75% of the county is forested.

Aside from agriculture, livestock raising and sericulture are widespread. The chief local crops are rice, corn, and soybeans.  Bituminous coal is also mined.

Railroads passing through Kyongwon include the Hambuk and Kogonwon Lines.  It is also connected by Shatuozi Border Road bridge to the Chinese city of Hunchun in the Yanbian autonomous prefecture.

History
Under Joseon period Kyongwon was invaded by Jurchens tribes in 1409. Therefore, to safeguard his people from the hostile Chinese and Jurchen people (later known as Manchus)  living in Manchuria, King Sejong the Great of Joseon ordered to establish there one of the six post/garrisons (hangul :육진 hanja :六鎭) in 1433. In 1977 the county's name was changed to Saebyol, but it was later reverted.

Administrative divisions
Kyongwon County is divided into 1 town ("ŭp") 21 villages ("ri") and 3 worker's districts ("rodongjagu", abbreviated as "gu").

Note: The Korean syllabe "som" (섬) in Ryudasom-ri, is converted into hanja "do" 島 because both of them  means island in that case.

See also
North Hamgyong
Geography of North Korea
Administrative divisions of North Korea

External links
Location of the four forts and the six posts

References

Counties of North Hamgyong